Cattleya mendelii is a species in the orchid genus Cattleya found in northeastern Colombia.

References

External links 

mendelii
Endemic flora of Colombia